Ashburton Central is the central suburb and central business district of Ashburton, in the Ashburton District and Canterbury Region of New Zealand's South Island.

Two people were killed and two others almost died during a shooting at the Work and Income office in Ashburton Central on 1 September 2014.

Tuarangi Home, located in Ashburton Central, is a public hospital facility operated by Canterbury District Health Board. It has 37 beds, and provides geriatric, psychogeriatric, rest home care, dementia care and medical services.

Demographics

Ashburton Central had a population of 141 at the 2018 New Zealand census, a decrease of 6 people (-4.1%) since the 2013 census, and a decrease of 21 people (-13.0%) since the 2006 census. There were 66 households. There were 75 males and 63 females, giving a sex ratio of 1.19 males per female. The median age was 53.6 years (compared with 37.4 years nationally), with 15 people (10.6%) aged under 15 years, 27 (19.1%) aged 15 to 29, 54 (38.3%) aged 30 to 64, and 45 (31.9%) aged 65 or older.

Ethnicities were 85.1% European/Pākehā, 4.3% Māori, 14.9% Pacific peoples, 4.3% Asian, and 2.1% other ethnicities (totals add to more than 100% since people could identify with multiple ethnicities).

The proportion of people born overseas was 19.1%, compared with 27.1% nationally.

Although some people objected to giving their religion, 34.0% had no religion, 57.4% were Christian, 2.1% were Hindu, 2.1% were Muslim and 4.3% had other religions.

Of those at least 15 years old, 21 (16.7%) people had a bachelor or higher degree, and 30 (23.8%) people had no formal qualifications. The median income was $31,100, compared with $31,800 nationally. The employment status of those at least 15 was that 54 (42.9%) people were employed full-time, 15 (11.9%) were part-time, and 6 (4.8%) were unemployed.

References

Suburbs of Ashburton
Central business districts in New Zealand